Stenomax is a genus of darkling beetles (insects belonging to the family Tenebrionidae) in the  subfamily Tenebrioninae.

Species
 Stenomax aeneus (Scopoli, 1763)
 Stenomax foudrasi (Mulsant & God, 1854) 
 Stenomax meridianus (Mulsant, 1854) 
 Stenomax piceus (Sturm, 1826) 
 Stenomax steindachneri (Apfelebeck, 1906)

References

Tenebrioninae
Tenebrionidae genera
Beetles of Europe